Tilbury Riverside railway station is a closed railway station located in the town of Tilbury in the borough and unitary authority of Thurrock in Essex, England, south of a triangular junction on the railway between Tilbury Town and East Tilbury. The station was  down the line from London Fenchurch Street station via Rainham.

History
It was opened on 13 April 1854 as part of the London, Tilbury and Southend Railway, providing an interchange with Port of Tilbury to take advantage of the increasing steamboat traffic in this area of the river Thames. The station was opened as Tilbury, and it became Tilbury Riverside on 3 August 1934. It used to provide an interchange with the Gravesend–Tilbury Ferry.

Tilbury engine shed was sited in the triangular junction to the north of Tilbury Riverside station.

Most trains from Fenchurch Street via Tilbury Town would reverse at this station and continue to Westcliff and Benfleet, with a few to or from Fenchurch Street starting or ending here, and there were also a few services operating short to or from Upminster. However, in 1986, London trains ceased calling here and the services were shortened to operate only from Upminster to Tilbury Riverside, East Tilbury and Stanford-le-Hope.

Tilbury Marine
Tilbury Marine was a short-lived station built by the Port of London Authority to serve boat trains, it was located within the docks area to the west of Tilbury Riverside. It opened on 15 May 1927 and closed on 1 May 1932. The station suffered bomb damage in World War 2 but was still largely intact in 1947.

Closure
On 30 November 1992, the station was closed. For many years prior to closure, the station was served only by certain trains on the local service from Upminster via Grays, because the nearby Dartford Crossing and increased car ownership had caused a decline in its importance as a passenger ferry terminal. There was some opposition to closure, but British Rail cited financial reasons for the closure with the annual cost of running the service at £180,000 against income of £11,000.

The station building can now be reached by a shuttle bus service from Tilbury Town railway station, which was a requirement of the line closure. Conditions placed include that the bus service is at least as frequent as the train service at closure, and also that any withdrawal of the bus service go through the same process as closure of the rail service.

The station building is now an indoor car park for Tilbury passenger terminal.

References

External links

Detailed description of Tilbury Riverside at Disused Stations web site

Transport in Thurrock
Disused railway stations in Essex
Former London, Tilbury and Southend Railway stations
Railway stations in Great Britain opened in 1854
Railway stations in Great Britain closed in 1992
Grade II* listed buildings in Essex
Tilbury
Railway depots in England